Christie Dawes (née Skelton, born 3 May 1980) is an Australian Paralympic wheelchair racing athlete. She has won three medals in athletics at seven Paralympics from 1996 to 2021.

Personal
When she was young, Dawes was very interested in athletics. At the age of 10, she was in a car accident. She survived, but became a paraplegic. Christie continued in her career in athletics, but also took up the job of a primary school teacher. She is married to her coach Andrew Dawes and their son was born in 2011.

Athletics

In 1996, Dawes competed in the Atlanta Paralympics, where she was awarded the 1996 Young Paralympian of the Year Award.

Three years later, she won a bronze medal for the 10 km Peachtree Road Race. In 2000, she competed in the Sydney Paralympics.

Next was the 2004 Paralympics in Athens Paralympics, where she competed in 800 m, 1500 m, and 5000 m races and the Marathon. She also competed in the 800 m wheelchair demonstration event at the 2004 Athens Olympics.

She competed in the 2006 Melbourne Commonwealth Games, coming fifth in the Women's 800 m EAD T54 event.

Dawes competed in the 2008 Summer Paralympics in Beijing, and was one of several competitors caught up in a crash during the final of the women's 5000 m T54 wheelchair event, eventually finishing sixth despite a broken front wheel. The race was re-run, and Dawes spoke out against the treatment of Canadian athlete Diane Roy, who had been awarded the gold medal in the event, only to have it taken back and replaced with a silver medal when she finished second in the re-run. Dawes won a silver medal at the Women's 4x100 m T53/54 event at the Beijing games.

A few months after the games, she came third in the New York City Marathon. In January 2009, she won the Oz Day 10K Wheelchair Road Race. In February 2010, Dawes won the 10 km world wheelchair road race championships in the United Arab Emirates.

After giving birth to her son in February 2011, she won three bronze medals at the 2011 National Titles in April. She then won a silver medal in the Chicago Marathon and came fourth in the New York City Marathon. At the 2012 London Paralympics, Dawes participated in the T54 class of the 800 m, 1500 m, 5000 m and marathon events.

She won a bronze medal in the T54 5000 m  and finished sixth in the T54 marathon. At the 2014 Glasgow Commonwealth Games, she came fourth in the 1500 m T54.

At the 2016 Rio de Janeiro Paralympics, she competed in four events and medalled in one. Christie, Angie Ballard, Madison de Rozario and Jemima Moore placed 3rd in the  relay but were disqualified, before successfully appealing the decision and being reinstated to 2nd. Her results in the 2016 Rio Olympics are as follows; 1500 m T54 placed 8th overall with a time of 3:26.00.  5000 m T54 she placed 11th in her heat with a time of 12:15.95 and did not advance to the finals. In the Marathon T54 she placed 7th overall with a time of 1:42:59.

Dawes then competed at the 2020 Tokyo Paralympics held in 2021, coming 8th in the Marathon T54.

At the 2022 Commonwealth Games, she finished 5th in the Women's Marathon T54.

References

External links

 
 Christine 'Christie' DAWES (Skelton) at Australian Athletics Historical Results
  (2004, 2008, 2012, 2016)
  (1996, 2000)

Australian female wheelchair racers
Commonwealth Games competitors for Australia
Olympic wheelchair racers of Australia
Paralympic athletes of Australia
Paralympic wheelchair racers
Athletes (track and field) at the 1996 Summer Paralympics
Athletes (track and field) at the 2000 Summer Paralympics
Athletes (track and field) at the 2004 Summer Paralympics
Wheelchair racers at the 2004 Summer Olympics
Athletes (track and field) at the 2006 Commonwealth Games
Athletes (track and field) at the 2008 Summer Paralympics
Athletes (track and field) at the 2012 Summer Paralympics
Athletes (track and field) at the 2014 Commonwealth Games
Athletes (track and field) at the 2016 Summer Paralympics
Athletes (track and field) at the 2020 Summer Paralympics
Athletes (track and field) at the 2022 Commonwealth Games
Medalists at the 2008 Summer Paralympics
Medalists at the 2012 Summer Paralympics
Medalists at the 2016 Summer Paralympics
Paralympic silver medalists for Australia
Paralympic bronze medalists for Australia
Paralympic medalists in athletics (track and field)
Wheelchair category Paralympic competitors
People with paraplegia
Sportswomen from New South Wales
Sportspeople from Newcastle, New South Wales
20th-century Australian women
21st-century Australian women
1980 births
Living people